Place may refer to:

Geography
 Place (United States Census Bureau), defined as any concentration of population
 Census-designated place, a populated area lacking its own municipal government

 "Place", a type of street or road name
 Often implies a dead end (street) or cul-de-sac
 Place, based on the Cornish word "plas" meaning mansion
 Place, a populated place, an area of human settlement
 Incorporated place (see municipal corporation), a populated area with its own municipal government
 Location (geography), an area with definite or indefinite boundaries or a portion of space which has a name in an area

Placenames
 Placé, a commune in Pays de la Loire, Paris, France
 Plače, a small settlement in Slovenia
 Place (Mysia), a town of ancient Mysia, Anatolia, now in Turkey
 Place, New Hampshire, a location in the United States

Facilities and structures
 Place House, a 16th-century mansion largely remodelled in the 19th century, in Fowey, Cornwall, England
 Place House, a 19th-century mansion on the site of a medieval priory, in St Anthony in Roseland, Cornwall, England
 Prideaux Place, an Elizabethan mansion in Padstow, Cornwall, England
 The Place (London), a dance and performance centre in London, England

People with the name
 Place (surname), people with the surname Place

Arts, entertainment, and media

Music
Places (Martin Solveig song), 2016
Places (Xenia Ghali song)

Albums
 Places (Béla Fleck album), 1988
 Places (Brad Mehldau album), 2000
 Places (Casiopea album), 2003
 "Places", a song from Ella Henderson's 2022 album Everything I Didn't Say
 Places (Georgie James album), 2007
 Places (Jan Garbarek album), 1978
 Places (Lea Michele album), 2017
 The Place (album), a 2003 music album

Other uses in arts, entertainment, and media
Place, Australian magazine merged into The Adelaide Review in 2008
 Place (Reddit), or /r/Place, a social experiment by Reddit for April Fool's Day
 The Place, London, a dance and performance centre in Camden, London
 To Place, a series of books on Iceland by artist Roni Horn
 Unity of place, one of the three classical unities for drama derived from Aristotle's Poetics
 Places Journal, a journal of architecture criticism
 The Place (film), a 2017 Italian film

Gambling
 Craps#Place, in craps a bet that a point number will be rolled before a seven
 Place, in horse racing, a parimutuel bet that a horse will finish first or within a predetermined number of positions of first. In North America, this would mean finishing first or second.

Mathematics
 Place (mathematics), an equivalence class of absolute values of an integral domain or field
 In place-value, or positional notation, the position occupied by a digit in a numeral
 Petri net, also known as a Place/transition net, a mathematical representation of discrete distributed systems

Society
 Place, a person's social position
 Place identity, a group of ideas concerning significance and meanings that particular places have for their inhabitants or users
 Place setting, a table setting for a single diner
 Sense of place, a phenomenon in which people strongly identify with a particular geographical area or location

See also

 
 Location (disambiguation)
 Locus (disambiguation), Latin for 'place'
 Placement (disambiguation)
 Plaice, a type of fish, misspelt as 'place' 
 Plas (disambiguation)
 Platz (disambiguation)
 Plaza
 Laplace (disambiguation), including "la Place"